The Rough Guide to the Music of India and Pakistan is a world music compilation album originally released in 1996. Part of the World Music Network Rough Guides series, it focuses on the music of India and Pakistan, ranging from Hindi film songs to Hindustani classical music to Qawwali to folk. The release was compiled by Phil Stanton, co-founder of the World Music Network. Artwork was designed by Impetus and  Anthony Cassidy.

Adam Greenberg of AllMusic gave the album three stars, recommending it to new listeners, while criticizing the truncating of the classical pieces. Michaelangelo Matos, writing for the Chicago Reader, described the release as "consistent" but "repetitious".

Track listing

References

External links 
 

1996 compilation albums
Hindustani classical music albums
World Music Network Rough Guide albums
Classical albums by Pakistani artists